George Dodd is an Australian comedy writer.  His list of credits as co-writer includes many popular Australian comedy TV shows from the 1990s up until today.

He appeared on-screen in Andrew Denton's 1989/1990 comedy series The Money or the Gun, under his own name, playing the part of a supposed expert on various subjects.

References 

 

Australian male comedians
Living people
Year of birth missing (living people)
Place of birth missing (living people)
Australian male actors